Mary-Jean Anaïs O'Doherty is an Australian-American coloratura soprano. She was the first prize winner in the 2013 Paris Opera Awards.

Life and career
O'Doherty was born in Houston, Texas, to an Australian father and an Armenian mother, Eliza Basmadjian, from Greece. She was educated at North Carolina School of the Arts and East Carolina University from which she received her Bachelor of Music degree in voice and flute performance as well as Bachelor of Arts in psychology in 2005. She was one of the 20 finalists in the 2006 Operatunity Oz talent search. O'Doherty won the ABC Symphony Australia Young Vocalist Award in 2007 and the following year was the first recipient of the Australian International Opera Award which included a scholarship to study at the Cardiff International Academy of Voice under the direction of Dennis O'Neill. and was also awarded a prize by the Tait Memorial Trust to assist with her studies in Cardiff. Shortly after completing her post-graduate diploma there in 2010, she sang the title role in Lucia di Lammermoor at the Prague State Opera and reprised the role with the company the following season. In November 2011, she made her Royal Albert Hall debut as a concert artist performing in Raymond Gubbay's Classical Spectacular.

In March 2015, it was announced that O'Doherty would be a member of the Armenian group Genealogy in their entry for the Eurovision Song Contest 2015. Along with the other foreign members of Genealogy, she received an Armenian passport from President Serzh Sargsyan on 28 April 2015.

References

Living people
Musicians from Houston
Australian operatic sopranos
American operatic sopranos
American people of Australian descent
American people of Armenian descent
American people of Greek descent
Citizens of Armenia through descent
Australian people of Armenian descent
Australian people of Greek descent
21st-century American women opera singers
Classical musicians from Texas
Genealogy (band) members
Singers from Texas
Armenian people of American descent
Armenian people of Australian descent
Armenian people of Greek descent
Year of birth missing (living people)